Georgia Mannion (born 25 March 2003), known professionally as George Alice, is an Australian singer-songwriter.

In 2019, Mannion released her debut single "Circles", for which she won Triple J's Unearthed High competition.

Early life
Georgia Mannion was born on 25 March 2003. She began busking at 11 years old.

Mannion attended Faith Lutheran College, in Tanunda, South Australia.

Musical style and influences
Mannion is primarily a pop, electronic, electropop, indie pop, and indie folk artist.

Alice's music has been likened to Maggie Rogers.

Career

2019: "Circles" and Unearthed High win
Mannion rose to prominence with her debut single "Circles", which was released in July 2019, and led her to win Triple J's 2019 Unearthed High competition. "Circles" ranked at number 64 in Triple J's Hottest 100 of 2019.

She released a music video for "Circles" through a partnership with Ditto Music, and subsequently signed regional deals with Paradigm Talent Agency.

2020-present: "Stuck in a Bubble" and "Teenager"
On 18 March 2020, Mannion released an acoustic version of "Circles". On 10 June, Alice released the single "Stuck in a Bubble", featuring producer Nasaya.

On 23 November 2020, Mannion released the single "Teenager". "Teenager" was co-written by Maribelle and produced by Japanese Wallpaper, and was premiered on Triple J's Breakfast with Bryce Mills.

In October 2021, Mannion released "Mid Years". The track was co-written with Alex Lahey and Gab Strum (aka Japanese Wallpaper), with the latter also spearheading production.

On 18 February 2022 Mannion released her debut EP, Growing Pains.

Discography

Extended plays

Singles

As lead artist

As featured artist

Awards and nominations

J Awards
The J Awards are an annual series of Australian music awards that were established by the Australian Broadcasting Corporation's youth-focused radio station Triple J. They commenced in 2005.

In 2019, Mannion received a nomination for the Unearthed Artist of the Year Award.

! 
|-
! scope="row"| 2019
| Herself
| Unearthed Artist of the Year
| 
| 
|}

References

External links
 

2003 births
Australian pop musicians
Australian women singers
Living people
Musicians from Adelaide